Saeeda Iqbal (Urdu: سعیدہ اقبال; born 29 December 1947) is a Pakistani Politician and a Member of Senate of Pakistan.

Political career
She Belongs to Pakistan Peoples Party, she joined the party in 2002 as the Secretary General of Party's Women Wing of the Islamabad District, later she was elected to the Senate of Pakistan on reserved seat for women from Islamabad area. She is the chairperson of senate committee on Defense Production and member Cabinet Secretariat, Information, Broadcasting and National Heritage, Inter-Provincial Coordination and Kashmir Affairs & Gilgit Baltistan.

See also
 List of Senators of Pakistan
 Ayatullah Durrani
 Abdul Haseeb Khan

References

External links

Living people
Members of the Senate of Pakistan
1947 births
Pakistan People's Party politicians